Igor Vladimirovich Korneev (born 4 September 1967) is a Russian professional football official and a former player who played as a midfielder, notably in La Liga for RCD Espanyol and FC Barcelona.

Club career
He was part of the Feyenoord squad that won the 2001–02 UEFA Cup, as an unused substitute in the final. He retired after the 2002–03 season with NAC Breda.

International career 
Korneev earned 14 caps for the Russia national team, scoring 3 goals. He was the part of Russia's 1994 World Cup squad.

Career statistics

In 1984–85 played for FC Spartak Moscow-d (reserves squad) at the Top League Youth Championship of the USSR — 31 matches, 4 goals. Also at the Top League Youth Championship in 1987 played for FC CSKA-2 Moscow-d (reserves squad) — 10 matches, 7 goals. Top League Youth Championship does not apply to the football league system.

Honours
Feyenoord
 Eredivisie: 1998–99
 UEFA Cup: 2001-02

Individual
 Footballer of the Year in Russia: 1991

References

1967 births
Living people
Footballers from Moscow
Association football midfielders
Soviet footballers
Russian footballers
Russian football managers
FC Spartak Moscow players
PFC CSKA Moscow players
RCD Espanyol footballers
FC Barcelona Atlètic players
FC Barcelona players
SC Heerenveen players
Feyenoord players
NAC Breda players
Soviet Top League players
Soviet First League players
La Liga players
Segunda División players
Eredivisie players
Soviet Union international footballers
Russia international footballers
UEFA Euro 1992 players
1994 FIFA World Cup players
Russian expatriate footballers
Russian expatriate sportspeople in Spain
Expatriate footballers in Spain
Russian expatriate sportspeople in the Netherlands
Expatriate footballers in the Netherlands
Dual internationalists (football)
Russian expatriate football managers
FC Asmaral Moscow players